Susan Shannon Engeleiter (née Susan Jane Shannon; born March 18, 1952) is an American Republican politician, lawyer, and businesswoman who served as the first female Administrator of the U.S. Small Business Administration.

Early life and education 
Engeleiter was born in Brookfield, Wisconsin to Helen "Jo" Hildebrandt Shannon and Arthur W. Shannon, a Republican fundraiser and later the treasurer of the Republican Party of Wisconsin. She graduated from Brookfield Central High School in 1970. She graduated from the University of Wisconsin–Madison in 1974 and received a juris doctor from the University of Wisconsin Law School in 1981. In 1976, she married Gerald Engeleiter. The couple later divorced.

Political career 
Engeleiter was elected to the 99th district of Wisconsin Assembly in 1974. At age 22, she was the youngest woman ever elected to the Wisconsin Legislature. She served in the Assembly until January 1979, having decided against running for re-election in 1978 and instead, sought the congressional seat being vacated by Bob Kasten, who decided to run for Wisconsin governor. Engeleiter lost the primary to then-State Senator Jim Sensenbrenner by 589 votes. In April 1980, Engeleiter was elected in a special election to the Wisconsin State Senate. There she served as Assistant Minority Leader from 1982 to 1984, and as Minority Leader from 1984 to 1989. She was the first woman to serve as Minority Leader.

1988 U.S. Senate campaign 
Engeleiter ran for the U.S. Senate seat being vacated by William Proxmire in 1988. In the primary election, she defeated state GOP chairman Steve King. King had labeled Engeleiter a moderate, while touting his conservative credentials. Engeleiter faced Democrat Herb Kohl, former chairman of the state Democratic Party, in the November general election.  On November 2, 1988, as polls showed Engeleiter and Kohl running neck-to-neck, President Ronald Reagan visited Milwaukee to headline a campaign rally and fundraiser for Engeleiter. Engeleiter lost the race to Kohl, by a 52% to 48% margin.

Business career 
In January 1989, President George H. W. Bush nominated Engeleiter to be the Administrator of the Small Business Administration. She was confirmed by the U.S. Senate and served in that position until 1991, the first woman to hold the position. During her term as administrator, Engeleiter was also appointed chairwoman of the National Women's Business Council. From 1991 to 1996 she also served on the President's Export Council.

After leaving the SBA, Engeleiter served as Vice-President of Government Affairs at Honeywell from 1992 to 1998. At Honeywell, she handled legislative and regulatory efforts in energy, environmental, and procurement areas. She represented Honeywell on several industry association boards and on United States government agency advisory boards.

Engeleiter has been President of Data Recognition Corporation since 1998 and the company's CEO since 2006. She also serves on the board of the Children's Theater Company, Wisconsin Alumni Association, Hazelden Betty Ford Foundation.

Electoral history

References

External links
 

|-

|-

|-

1952 births
20th-century American politicians
20th-century American women politicians
Administrators of the Small Business Administration
American chief operating officers
Businesspeople from Wisconsin
Candidates in the 1978 United States elections
Living people
Republican Party members of the Wisconsin State Assembly
People from Brookfield, Wisconsin
University of Wisconsin–Madison alumni
University of Wisconsin Law School alumni
Republican Party Wisconsin state senators
Women state legislators in Wisconsin
21st-century American women